The GWR 360 Class was a small series (12 examples) of 0-6-0 freight steam locomotives designed for the Great Western Railway by Joseph Armstrong and built at Swindon Works in 1866.

Numbering
When built, they were numbered 360 to 371 on the Capital list. In September 1866, the last two were transferred to the Revenue list as 1000 and 1001. In August 1867, it was decided that the Revenue list should start at 1001, not 1000; and so 1000 was renumbered 1015.

Design
As built, they had slightly smaller boilers than the similar and much more numerous 388 Class which went into production later the same year. Their coupled wheelbase was also  shorter than that of the 388's in the class.

Use
To start with they worked between Birmingham and Chester, though later they were seen in South Wales, at Didcot and in the Birmingham-Stourbridge area. They were withdrawn between 1918 and 1933, the last (No.363) having accumulated in its 70 years an impressive .

References

Sources

0360
0-6-0 locomotives
Railway locomotives introduced in 1866
Freight locomotives
Scrapped locomotives